Kawartha Speedway is a 3/8 mile paved oval located in Fraserville, Ontario, approximately 10 km southwest of Peterborough. The paved track is within the harness racing track, temporary grandstands are brought onto the harness racing tracks surface. In 2006, Kawartha Speedway held the final CASCAR Super Series race before it became the NASCAR Canadian Tire Series in 2007. Since 2004, Kawartha was the host of the CASCAR Super Series finale. Kawartha Speedway held the finale of the inaugural NASCAR Canadian Tire Series Season which was won by Scott Steckly. The following year, Jason Hathaway picked up his first ever win, and in 2009 D. J. Kennington won.

The facility is also host to a number of other racing venues. After some additional paving of the infield, Kawartha Durham Kart Club made the speedway its home track in 2009. With a variety of track layouts it has proven to be a popular venue within the karting community. The Peterborough Motor Sports Club also hosts solo events as part of the club's championship season, bringing in a wide variety of vehicles from stock to fully modified rally cars. Although hard to notice if you are not looking, there is also a specially constructed course for soap box cars. The 'Gravity Cavity' is located behind the parking lot and hosts a championship series for soap box enthusiasts.

Summer Shoot-Out Series

In an attempt to raise diminishing car counts all over Southern Ontario, Kawartha Speedway announced a 6 race late model series, split between Kawartha and Capital City Speedway in Stittsville, Ontario. Three events were held at Kawartha and three at the Capital City Speedway. All events were 100 laps with the exception of a July race at Kawartha which was 200 laps, called the ACT Summer Sizzler.

See also
List of auto racing tracks in Canada
Peterborough Speedway
Mosport Speedway

References

External links
Kawartha Downs
Kawartha Speedway race results at Racing-Reference

Horse racing venues in Ontario
Casinos in Ontario
NASCAR tracks
Paved oval racing venues in Ontario
Motorsport venues in Ontario
Motorsport venues in Canada
Tourist attractions in Peterborough County